The president of Guatemala is both the head of state and the head of government. The president has therefore strong executive powers which are, in part, reflected in a broad number of agencies that depend directly from the presidency. These agencies include "secretariats of the presidency".

The Secretariats of the Presidency include:

References

Government of Guatemala